Sniježnica is a mountain located in the southernmost part of Croatia, north of the Konavle region.

References

Landforms of Dubrovnik-Neretva County
Mountains of Croatia